Tarmac may refer to:

Engineered surfaces
 Tarmacadam, a mainly historical tar-based material for macadamising road surfaces, patented in 1902
 Asphalt concrete, a macadamising material using asphalt instead of tar which has largely superseded tarmacadam
 Tarmac, incorrectly used as a term for any paved surface of an airport, for example
 Airport apron
 Taxiway
 Runway

Companies
 Tarmac (company), a British building materials company 
 Tarmac Building Products, the construction materials division of Tarmac
 Tarmac Group, former UK-based multinational building materials and construction company
 Tarmac Construction, part of Tarmac Group until 1999 when sold off as Carillion

See also
 Tarmak, a village in Sakht Sar Rural District, Central District of Ramsar County, Mazandaran Province, Iran
 Tarmac scam or tarmacking, a confidence trick